Christie Burke (born October 20, 1989) is a Canadian actress known for her portrayal of Renesmee Cullen in The Twilight Saga: Breaking Dawn – Part 2. The actor graduated from New Westminster Secondary School in 2007.

In 2023, Burke serves in a leading role in the TV series The Ark on Syfy.

Filmography

Film

Television

References

External links
 

Living people
21st-century Canadian actresses
1989 births